The Municipal District of Spirit River No. 133 is a municipal district (MD) in northwest Alberta, Canada, north of Grande Prairie. Located in the Upper Peace Region, its municipal office is located in the Town of Spirit River.

History 
The MD of Spirit River No. 133 was incorporated in 1916.

Geography

Communities and localities 
 
The following urban municipalities are surrounded by the MD of Spirit River No. 133.
Cities
none
Towns
Spirit River
Villages
Rycroft
Summer villages
none

The following hamlets are located within the MD of Spirit River No. 133.
Hamlets
none

The following localities are located within the MD of Spirit River No. 133.
Localities 
Bridgeview
Manir
Prestville
Silverwood
Spirit River Settlement

Demographics 

In the 2016 Census of Population conducted by Statistics Canada, the MD of Spirit River No. 133 had a population of 700 living in 274 of its 306 total private dwellings, a  change from its 2011 population of 713.

See also 
List of communities in Alberta
List of municipal districts in Alberta

References

External links 

 
Spirit River
1916 establishments in Alberta